The Texas Natural Resources Information System (TNRIS) is the principal state archive in Texas for natural resources data.  TNRIS provides a central access point for Texas Natural Resources data, census data, digital and paper maps, and information  about datasets collected by state agencies and other organizations.  TNRIS is a division of the Texas Water Development Board (TWDB).

About TNRIS
TNRIS was established by the Legislature in 1968 as the Texas Water-Oriented Data Bank. In 1972, after four years of growth and diversification, it was renamed the Texas Natural Resources Information System. The mission of TNRIS is to provide a "centralized information system incorporating all Texas natural resource data, socioeconomic data related to natural resources, and indexes related to that data that are collected by state agencies or other entities." (Texas Water Code, 16.021).

The TNRIS offices are located in the Stephen F. Austin Building, 1700 North Congress Avenue, in Austin, Texas.

External links
 tnris.org Official Agency Site
 Texas Water Development Board Parent Agency

Government of Texas